The government of Abu Dhabi is planning a tram system, as part of a broader long-term transport strategy. In 2009, it was suggested that the tram system would enter service in 2014; however, as of 2021, nothing has yet materialised. The network is expected to cost around $5Bn.

Network
A 340 km tram network is planned. The network will have three lines, focussing on the CBD, with connections to Reem, Suwa, Khalifa City A and B, Al Raha beach, and Saadiyat Islands.

References

Rapid transit in the United Arab Emirates
Transport in Abu Dhabi